David Roth may refer to:

David Roth (magician) (1952–2021), American magician
David Lee Roth (born 1954), American rock musician 
David Martin Roth American convicted murderer
David Roth (opera director) (1959–2015), American opera director and manager
David Roth (soccer) (born 1985), American soccer midfielder
David Wells Roth (born 1957), American figurative painter
David Roth (writer), American sportswriter